Ngamaru Rongotini Ariki (c. 1831 – 31 March 1903) was a sovereign of the Cook Islands. He was the ariki of the Ngamaru dynasty on the island of Atiu, one of the chiefdoms of Ngaputoru, which consisted of three adjoining islands —Atiu, Mitiaro, and Mauke. In the 1860s he married Makea Takau, a princess of Rarotonga. In 1871 Makea Takau became ariki of Rarotonga and queen regnant of the newly established Kingdom of Rarotonga, as a consequence making Ngamaru prince consort of the realm of the united Cook Islands.

He was Representative of Atiu, Mitiaro and Mauke in the Federal Council and also a native Judge of the Ariki's Court at Avarua. Ngamaru was a man of strong personal character, and had the happy knack of settling troublesome matters with a jocular remark. He was also a commercial power to his people, being an inter-island trader with a schooner of his own.

Prince Ngamaru died of blood poisoning after an injury to his hand, he was 72 years of age. He was buried in Queen Makea's private graveyard at Para O Tane Palace.

See also
 Kingdom of Rarotonga
 History of the Cook Islands
 House of Ariki

Notes

References
 Grimshaw, Beatrice Ethel. In the strange South seas. Hutchinson & Co., 1907
 Gilson, Richard Philip. The Cook Islands, 1820-1950. Victoria University of Wellington, 1980; 
 Craig, Robert D. Historical Dictionary of Polynesia. Rowman & Littlefield, 2011. ; p. 154

External links
 Te Papa Museum of New Zealand collections (Photograph)
 Land Tenure in the Cook Islands (NZETC)
 Prince Ngamaru's involvement of Takutea land ownership
 News of the Waikare's Excurtion (Papers Past)

1831 births
People from Atiu
Rarotongan monarchs
Royalty of the Cook Islands
1903 deaths